Raman Ramanau (born 3 July 1994) is a Belarusian professional racing cyclist, who currently rides for UCI Continental team . He rode at the 2015 UCI Track Cycling World Championships.

Major results

Road

2012
 4th Overall La Coupe du Président de la Ville de Grudziądz
2015
 6th Grand Prix of Moscow
2016
 3rd Belgrade–Banja Luka I
 7th Memoriał Andrzeja Trochanowskiego
2020
 5th GP Belek

Track

2012
 National Track Championships
2nd Team pursuit
2nd Scratch
3rd Omnium
2013
 3rd  Points race, UEC European Under-23 Championships
2014
 1st  Team pursuit, National Track Championships
 3rd  Scratch, UEC European Under-23 Championships
2015
 UEC European Under-23 Championships
1st  Points race
3rd  Team pursuit
2016
 1st  Points race, 2016–17 UCI Track Cycling World Cup, Apeldoorn
 3rd  Points race, UEC European Championships
 3rd  Points race, UEC European Under-23 Championships
 4th Scratch, UCI Track World Championships
2017
 National Track Championships
1st  Team pursuit
1st  Madison
3rd Scratch
2018
 1st  Team pursuit, National Track Championships

References

External links

1994 births
Living people
Belarusian male cyclists
People from Mazyr
European Games competitors for Belarus
Cyclists at the 2019 European Games
Sportspeople from Gomel Region